"Rules Don't Stop" is the first single to be released from We Are Scientists' fourth studio album Barbara. It was released on 5 April 2010 and debuted at number 14 on the UK Indie Chart. The song also features on the video game DiRT 3,  FIFA 11, and the PlayStation 3 game MLB 10 The Show.

Release

The Song Was released on April 5, 2010 the song was Included in Dirt 3 FIFA 11 and MLB 10 The Show

Music video
The music video only shows vocalist/guitarist Keith Murray and bassist Chris Cain, without their new drummer Andy Burrows. They have different coloured backgrounds and are sometimes pictured with boxed heads only showing their mouth region.

Chart performance
"Rules Don't Stop" debuted on the UK Indie Chart at number 14 on 11 April 2010.

References

External links
 Official website

2010 singles
2010 songs
We Are Scientists songs
PIAS Recordings singles